María Amalia, Infanta of Spain (9 January 1779 in Madrid – 22 July 1798 in Madrid), was a Spanish princess. She was a daughter of King Charles IV of Spain, in 1795, she married her uncle Infante Antonio Pascual of Spain.

Early life

Born at the Royal Palace of El Pardo, Maria Amalia was the second surviving daughter of King Carlos IV of Spain (1748–1819) and his wife Maria Luisa of Parma (1751–1819), a granddaughter of Louis XV of France.

Maria Amalia's mother, Queen Maria Luisa, arranged her marriage to her maternal first cousin Louis, hereditary Prince of Parma. The Prince arrived at the Spanish court, in 1794, to finish his education. He was blond, good looking, of amiable character and he had a great interest in science.  Five years younger than her cousin, Infanta Maria Amalia was fifteen years old at the time. She was not particularly attractive and was sullen, reserved and shy in character.  Louis, who was equally shy, preferred her younger sister, Infanta Maria Luisa, who although only twelve, was of a more cheerful disposition and somewhat better looking. Maria Amalia's parents accepted the unexpected change of brides, but it became a matter of urgency for them to find a husband for the saddened and scorned Maria Amalia. As she was the elder of the two sisters, it would be humiliating for Maria Amalia that her younger sister not only would marry her previous fiance, but that Maria Luisa would marry first.

Marriage and death
To find a new groom for Maria Amalia of a royal rank in such a short period of time was not an easy affair; thus her parents decided to marry Maria Amalia to her uncle, Antonio Pascual, Infante of Spain, who was twenty-four years older than she was. Infante Antônio was thirty nine years old. Considered of very limited intelligence, his interests were gardening, agriculture and hunting. He had remained unmarried without responsibilities of any kind.

Maria Amalia married her uncle on 25 August 1795 at the Royal Palace of La Granja. It was a double wedding; at the same time her sister, 13-year-old Maria Luisa, married Luis, Prince of Parma, Maria Amalia's original intended groom. The two couples continued living at the Spanish royal court.

During the fall 1797, Maria Amalia became pregnant with her first child. On 20 July 1798 she went into labour. The delivery was complicated. The baby got stuck by the shoulders in the birth canal and the doctors were unable to extract him. After two days, the surgeon finally intervened. By then the baby, a boy, was dead.  While her son was buried at El Escorial, Maria Amalia suffered in agony. She had contracted an infection during the ordeal, and she died on 22 July 1798. She was only nineteen years old.

Ancestry

Notes

References
Bearne Charlton, Catherine. A Royal Quartette. London: T. F. Unwin, 1908.
Mateos Sainz de Medrano, Ricardo. Los desconocidos infantes de España. Thassalia, 1996. 
Rubio, Maria José. Reinas de España. La Esfera de los Libros, Madrid, 2009.

External links

1779 births
1798 deaths
House of Bourbon (Spain)
Spanish infantas
Burials in the Pantheon of Infantes at El Escorial
Deaths in childbirth
Daughters of kings